Ján Kroner (1 May 1927 – 24 June 1986) was a Slovak actor and one of the first generation members of the Kroner family. He was the youngest brother of Jozef, as well the father of Janko Kroner.

Filmography
 1971: Keby som mal pušku
 1973: Dolina
 1973: Očovské pastorále
 1974: Oblaky - modriny (TV)
 1975: Pacho, hybský zbojník
 1975: Nepokojná láska (TV)
 1976: Milosrdný čas
 1983: Výlet do mladosti (TV)
 1983: Mŕtvi učia živých
 1984: Povstalecká história  (TV)
 1984: Neľahké lásky (TV)
 1985: Materské znamienko (TV)
 1985: Karabínka (TV)
 1985: Búrka (TV)

See also
 List of Czechoslovak films
 List of people surnamed Kroner

Further reading

References

General

Specific

External links

 Ján Kroner at FDb.cz
 
 Ján Kroner at Kinobox.cz

Jan
1927 births
Slovak male film actors
Slovak male television actors
Slovak male stage actors
20th-century Slovak male actors
1986 deaths